The crane hawk (Geranospiza caerulescens) is a species of bird of prey in the family Accipitridae. It is monotypic within the genus Geranospiza.

Taxonomy
The crane hawk used to be many species that were recently lumped into one. Those species are now designated as subspecies. Color varies clinally, though, and it is now commonly accepted that they comprise one species. There are also two species of harrier-hawks in Africa of the genus Polyboroides that, while they are morphologically and behaviorally similar, are not very closely related. They serve as a good example of convergent evolution.

The crane hawk includes the following subspecies:
 G. c. livens - Bangs & Penard, TE, 1921
 G. c. nigra - (Du Bus de Gisignies, 1847)
 G. c. balzarensis - Sclater, WL, 1918
 G. c. caerulescens - (Vieillot, 1817)
 G. c. gracilis - (Temminck, 1821)
 G. c. flexipes - Peters, JL, 1935

Habitat and distribution
Crane hawks occur in tropical lowlands at the edge of forests and are almost always closely associated with water. It is found in Argentina, Belize, Bolivia, Brazil, Colombia, Costa Rica, Ecuador, El Salvador, French Guiana, Guatemala, Guyana, Honduras, Mexico, Nicaragua, Panama, Paraguay, Peru, Suriname, Trinidad, Uruguay, and Venezuela. They are an irruptive and local migrant, probably moving in response to changing water conditions.

Behavior
These hawks often forage by scanning from a perch or on the wing and swooping down to grab prey. However, they are notable for having “double-jointed” tarsal bones, allowing them to reach into tree cavities and extract prey, a trait they share only with the genus of African harrier-hawks Polyboroids. Their main prey are small vertebrates, especially rodents, bats, lizards, snakes, frogs and small birds (especially nestlings of parrots and woodpeckers), but they have also been known to eat larger insects (such as beetles, cicadas and cockroaches), spiders, other arthropods and snails.

During breeding, nests are built in tree canopies, often in clumps of orchids or other epiphytes. The nest is a shallow cup of twigs, anywhere from 10–25 metres up in a tree. Clutches are usually 1-2 white-or-bluish-tinged eggs.

Conservation
Nowhere is the crane hawk particularly common, but it is still widely distributed. However, it is considered threatened in Mexico, endangered in El Salvador, and at low risk in Argentina.

References

External links
Crane hawk: Photos, notes in www.birds-caatinga.com

Accipitridae
Birds of Central America
Birds of Mexico
Birds of prey of South America
Higher-level bird taxa restricted to the Neotropics
crane hawk
Taxa named by Louis Jean Pierre Vieillot
Taxonomy articles created by Polbot